The 1922 Bowling Green Normals football team was an American football team that represented Bowling Green State Normal School (later Bowling Green State University) as a member of the Northwest Ohio League (NOL) during the 1922 college football season. In its first and only season under head coach Allen Snyder, the team compiled a 4–2–1 record and outscored opponents by a total of 98 to 46. Orville Raberding was the team captain.

Schedule

References

Bowling Green
Bowling Green Falcons football seasons
Northwest Ohio League football champion seasons
Bowling Green Normals football